Denzil Jones (birth registered second ¼ 1926  – 25 December 2010), also known by the nickname of "Buck" (after actor Buck Jones), was a Welsh rugby union, and professional rugby league footballer who played in the 1940s and 1950s.

Background
Denzil Jones' birth was registered in Merthyr Tydfil district, Wales, he worked at the Margam Knuckle Yard. and he died aged 84 in Margam, Wales.

Playing career

Notable rugby union tour matches
Denzil Jones played, and was captain, in the combined Aberavon RFC/Neath RFC teams' 0–22 defeat by South Africa at Talbot Athletic Ground, Aberavon on Saturday 17 November 1951.

Rugby league club career
Denzil Jones' made his début for Wigan in the 34-3 victory over Barrow at Central Park, Wigan on Saturday 24 January 1953, and scored his only try for Wigan in the 37-5 victory over Liverpool City at Central Park, Wigan on Saturday 7 March 1953, and he played his last match for Wigan in the 16-8 victory over Bramley at Barley Mow, Bramley on Monday 20 April 1953.

Genealogical information
Denzil Jones was married to Betty Smart. They had children; Ralph Jones (birth registered during first ¼  in Neath district), Pamela Jones (birth registered during fourth ¼  in Neath district), and Robert D. Jones (birth registered during second ¼  in Neath district).

References

External links
Search for "Denzil" at rugbyleagueproject.org
Search for "Jones" at rugbyleagueproject.org
Statistics at wigan.rlfans.com
Obituary at bmdsonline.co.uk
Obituary at thisisannouncements.co.uk
(archived by web.archive.org) Quiz Answers 2

1926 births
2010 deaths
Aberavon RFC players
Rugby league players from Merthyr Tydfil County Borough
Rugby league props
Rugby union players from Merthyr Tydfil County Borough
Rugby union props
Taibach RFC players
Welsh rugby league players
Welsh rugby union players
Wigan Warriors players